The Canberra Yacht Club was formed in 1959 in anticipation of the creation of Lake Burley Griffin in the centre of Canberra, Australia, which happened in the 1960s. It is located on the shore in the suburb of Yarralumla.

Its members have competed in the Sydney to Hobart yacht race.

Notes

External links
 

Yacht clubs in Canberra
1959 establishments in Australia
Sports clubs established in 1959